The National Soccer League (NSL) was a South African football (soccer) league established in 1985, as a response to boardroom disagreements in the new topflight non-racial league NPSL (established in 1978 after a merger between NFL and “NPSL for African people”). As the NSL accounted for the continuation of the major federation, the remainings of NPSL (known as “new NPSL”), decided after 10 years co-existence in 1985–95, finally to merge with NSL, to form today’s Premier Soccer League (PSL).

History

Champions

Most titles

Top goalscorers

References

 
South
Defunct soccer leagues in South Africa